Bjarne Pettersen (16 June 1907 – 17 May 1975) was a Norwegian footballer. He played in seven matches for the Norway national football team from 1931 to 1933.

References

External links
 

1907 births
1975 deaths
Norwegian footballers
Norway international footballers
Place of birth missing
Association footballers not categorized by position